George Van Horn (February 5, 1850 – May 3, 1904) was a U.S. Representative from New York.

Born in Otsego, New York, Van Horn attended the common schools, the Cooperstown Seminary, and the New Berlin Academy.
He studied law.
He was admitted to the bar in February 1871 and practiced in Cooperstown, New York.

Van Horn was elected clerk of Otsego County in 1881 and reelected in 1884.

Van Horn was elected supervisor of Otsego and twice reelected.
He served as member of the Democratic county committee.

Van Horn was elected as a Democrat to the Fifty-second Congress (March 4, 1891 – March 3, 1893).
He was an unsuccessful candidate for reelection in 1892 to the Fifty-third Congress.
He engaged in banking, and was vice president of the Second National Bank of Cooperstown, New York, until his death there on May 3, 1904.
He was interred in Lakewood Cemetery.

Sources

1850 births
1904 deaths
American people of Dutch descent
Democratic Party members of the United States House of Representatives from New York (state)
People from Otsego, New York
People from Cooperstown, New York
19th-century American politicians